Barbara Kaczorowska (born 21 October 1960), née Szumiło, is a Polish chess player who won the Polish Women's Chess Championship in 1993. FIDE Woman International Master (1989).

Chess career
Since the mid of 1980s to the mid of 1990s Barbara Kaczorowska was one of the leading Polish women chess player. She twice won Polish Junior Chess Championship (1978, 1979) in the category U-20.
From 1975 to 1996 Barbara Kaczorowska played 14 times in the Polish Women's Chess Championship's finals and won three medals: gold (1993), silver (1989) and bronze (1985). Also she won 3 gold medals (1991, 1993, 1995) in Polish Team Chess Championships. In 1989 she represented Poland at the Women's World Chess Championship zonal tournament in Brno.

References

External links
 
 
 

1960 births
Polish female chess players
Chess Woman International Masters
Living people